The women's beach volleyball tournament at the 2021 Southeast Asian Games took place at the Tuần Châu, Quảng Ninh, Vietnam from 15 to 20 May 2022.

Schedule
All times are Vietnam Standard Time (UTC+07:00)

Seeds
Teams were seeded is the preliminary round according to the following draw:

Results

Round robin

Knockout round

Bronze medal match

Gold medal match

See also
Men's tournament

References

External links
  
Official Result – AVC

Volleyball at the 2021 Southeast Asian Games
2022 in beach volleyball